Austro may refer to:

 Austro-, a prefix denoting Austria
 Austro (automobile), an Austrian cyclecar manufactured 1913–1914
 Austro Engine, an aircraft engine manufacturer
 Ēostre or *Austrō, a Proto-Germanic goddess widely associated with spring and dawn
 As part of scientific neologisms, 'austro-' means “South”

See also
Australo- (disambiguation)